Paco was an American indie rock band consisting of musicians Dominique Durand, Andy Chase, Michael Hampton and Gary Maurer. Their 2004 album This Is Where We Live was released by Chase's Unfiltered Records and was ranked in the lower positions of CMJ New Music Monthlys "Top 200 Radio" chart in mid-2004. The group formed during Durand's first pregnancy when she, Chase and Adam Schlesinger had completed work on their 2000 album Long Distance.

Discography

References 

2003 establishments in New York City
Indie pop groups from New York (state)
Musical groups established in 2003
Musical groups from New York City